General elections were held in Saint Lucia on 6 April 1987. The result was a victory for the United Workers Party, which won nine of the seventeen seats. Voter turnout was 60.7%.

As the UWP had only won a single seat majority, Prime Minister John Compton called early elections, which were held on 30 April in order to try to increase the party's majority. However, although their share of the vote rose to 53.2%, the SLP retained their eight seats.

Results

References

Saint Lucia
1987 I
General
Saint Lucia